According to the United States Department of State, human trafficking in the Netherlands is a problem which affects particularly women and girls, who are forced to work in the sex industry. In the year of 2009 there were 909 registered victims of human trafficking. U.S. State Department's Office to Monitor and Combat Trafficking in Persons placed the country in "Tier 1" in 2017. 

In 2017, it was estimated by the Dutch National Rapporteur on Trafficking in Human Beings and Sexual Violence against Children that more than 6,000 people in the Netherlands fall victim to human trafficking each year. Two thirds of the people trafficked, about 4,000 people per year, fall victim to sexual slavery and abuse. This group consists largely of Dutch women, including minors (1,320 girls each year) who are preyed upon by so-called "lover boys". The other 2,000 victims of human trafficking are largely foreigners who are put to work by organized crime groups.

According to the US Department of State, the Netherlands is both a source and destination country for men, women, and children subjected to trafficking in persons, specifically forced prostitution and forced labor, though, to a lesser extent, it is a transit country for such trafficking. According to the US Department of State, the top five countries of origin for victims are the Netherlands, China, Nigeria, Hungary, and Sierra Leone.

See also
Human rights in the Netherlands#Human trafficking

References

External links 
Coordinatië Centrum Mensenhandel/CoMensha

Netherlands
Netherlands
Human rights abuses in the Netherlands
Crime in the Netherlands by type